Bezrukavka is a rural locality (a selo) and the administrative center of Bezrukavsky Selsoviet, Rubtsovsky District, Altai Krai, Russia. The population was 1,778 as of 2013. There are 19 streets.

Geography 
Bezrukavka is located 12 km northeast of Rubtsovsk (the district's administrative centre) by road. Beryozovka is the nearest rural locality.

References 

Rural localities in Rubtsovsky District